Puyi Tha is a 2019 Burmese comedy film, directed by Ko Zaw (Ar Yone Oo) starring Khine Thin Kyi, Nay Chi Oo, Kyaw Ye Aung, Ye Aung, Chan Min Ye Htut, Khin Hlaing, Tyron Bejay, Htet Aung Shine and Aye Chan Maung. The film, produced by Sein Htay Film Production premiered Myanmar on August 8, 2019.

Cast
Khine Thin Kyi as Htet Myint Mo
Nay Chi Oo as Kaung Kin Pyar
Kyaw Ye Aung as U Arkar
Khin Hlaing as Mommy Hlaing
Ye Aung
Chan Min Ye Htut
Tyron Bejay
Htet Aung Shine
Aye Chan Maung

References

2019 films
2010s Burmese-language films
Burmese comedy films
Films shot in Myanmar
2019 comedy films